Tsaritsyno may refer to:
Tsaritsyno District, a district in Southern Administrative Okrug of Moscow, Russia
Tsaritsyno (Moscow Metro), a station of the Moscow Metro, Russia
Tsaritsyno Park, a park in Moscow

See also
Volgograd, formerly known as Tsaritsyn